LeMarcus Rowell (born December 10, 1982 in Opelika, Alabama) is a former Canadian football linebacker for the Calgary Stampeders of the Canadian Football League. He was originally signed by the Calgary Stampeders as an undrafted free agent in 2008. He played college football at Jacksonville State.

External links
Just Sports Stats
Calgary Stampeders bio

1982 births
Living people
Canadian football defensive linemen
Calgary Stampeders players
American players of Canadian football
Jacksonville State Gamecocks football players
Auburn Tigers football players
African-American players of Canadian football
People from Opelika, Alabama
21st-century African-American sportspeople
20th-century African-American people